Arthur Joseph Champion, Baron Champion PC (26 July 1897 – 2 March 1985), known as Joe Champion, was a British Labour Party politician.

He was born in Glastonbury as the youngest of six children and went on to work on the railways after serving in the First World War. He  married Mary Emma (née Williams) in October 1930 and the couple had one daughter,  born in December 1931.

He was elected as Member of Parliament (MP) for South Derbyshire at the 1945 general election, defeating the sitting Conservative MP Paul Emrys-Evans to win a majority of nearly 23,000 votes.  After boundary changes for the 1950 general election, he was re-elected for the new South East Derbyshire constituency, and held that seat until his defeat at the 1959 general election by only 12 votes.

He was made a life peer on 11 May 1962, as Baron Champion, of Pontypridd in the County of Glamorgan. In January 1967 he was appointed as a Privy Counsellor.

In the last year of Clement Attlee's Labour Government, he served from  April to October 1951 as Parliamentary Secretary to the Ministry of Agriculture and Fisheries. After taking his seat in the House of Lords, he was a Minister without Portfolio from 1964 to 1967 in Harold Wilson's government. He died in Pontypridd aged 87.

References 

Richard Kimber's political science resources: UK General Elections since 1832

External links 

1897 births
1985 deaths
Labour Party (UK) MPs for English constituencies
Labour Party (UK) life peers
Members of the Parliament of the United Kingdom for constituencies in Derbyshire
Members of the Privy Council of the United Kingdom
Ministers in the Attlee governments, 1945–1951
Ministers in the Wilson governments, 1964–1970
National Union of Railwaymen-sponsored MPs
People from Glastonbury
UK MPs 1945–1950
UK MPs 1950–1951
UK MPs 1951–1955
UK MPs 1955–1959
UK MPs who were granted peerages
Life peers created by Elizabeth II